Maria Teresa del Real is an American ballet dancer (born 1963, in Miami). She achieved success early in her career by winning a bronze medal at the International Ballet Competition in Varna, Bulgaria in 1983. During her subsequent international career she held principal dancer positions with Ballets de San Juan (Puerto Rico), Pittsburgh Ballet Theater (USA), Royal Ballet of Flanders (Belgium) and English National Ballet. She has partnered with Rudolf Nureyev, Fernando Bujones, José Manuel Carreño, Maxamiliano Guerra and Carlos Acosta.

References 

1963 births
Living people
American ballerinas
21st-century American women